Thomas Zeller Jr. (born April 30, 1969) is an American journalist who has covered poverty, technology, energy policy and the environment, among other topics, for a variety of publications, including 12 years on staff as a writer and editor at The New York Times. He has also held staff positions at National Geographic Magazine and The Huffington Post.

In 2013-2014, he was awarded a Knight Science Journalism Fellowship at MIT.

Zeller has won several awards for visual journalism and multimedia reporting from the Society of News Design and from the University of Navarra, Spain (Malofiej Awards), including prizes for a collection of essays and graphics lending historical context to the wars in Iraq and Afghanistan; an interactive reconstruction of the shooting of Amadou Diallo; and a multimedia documentary of a Louisiana plantation, part of The Times'''s Pulitzer prize-winning "How Race Is Lived in America" series.New York Times Talk to the Newsroom

In 2016, Zeller and Pulitzer-prizewinning science writer Deborah Blum launched a new digital science publication  titled Undark Magazine. He currently serves as the publication's editor in chief.

He is a co-editor and contributing author of the book "A Tactical Guide to Science Journalism: Lessons From the Front Lines" (Oxford University Press, 2022).

Zeller resides in Montana with his wife, Katherine Zeller.

References

External links
Undark Magazine, About
Story archive at The New York TimesTom Zeller Jr., personal Web site
The Huffington Post, bio and stories by Tom Zeller Jr. at The Huffington Post''

American male journalists
Living people
1969 births
Cleveland State University alumni
Columbia University Graduate School of Journalism alumni
Journalists from Ohio
Writers from Cleveland
20th-century American journalists
20th-century American male writers
21st-century American journalists
21st-century American male writers